Pododesmus macrochisma, common name the green falsejingle or the Alaska jingle, is a species of saltwater clam, a marine bivalve mollusc in the family Anomiidae, the jingle shells.

This species inhabits the northwest Sea of Japan, and more specifically, the coast of the South Primorye at Hokkaido Island, the northern part of Honshu Island, off the southern and eastern Sakhalin in the Kuril Islands, and in the east of Kamchatka in the Commander and Aleutian Islands.  More recently it has been found in the Chukchi Sea near Alaska, potentially due to global warming.

References

 Huber, M. (2010). Compendium of bivalves. A full-color guide to 3,300 of the world’s marine bivalves. A status on Bivalvia after 250 years of research. Hackenheim: ConchBooks. 901 pp., 1 CD-ROM.

External links

Anomiidae